It's Love That's Ruining Me (Italian: È l'amor che mi rovina) is a 1951 Italian comedy film directed by Mario Soldati and starring Walter Chiari, Lucia Bosè and Aroldo Tieri.

The film's sets were designed by the art director Guido Fiorini. Shooting took place in Turin and at the ski resort of Sestriere in the Alps. It earned around 137 million lira at the Italian box office.

Synopsis
Walter, a salesman in a sports shop who is far from sporty, falls in love with the ski instructor Clara. In order to try and woo her he follows Clara to a ski resort where he gets mixed up with network of foreign spies trying to smuggle a stolen explosive out of the country.

Cast
 Walter Chiari as  Walter Palaccioni 
 Lucia Bosé as Clara Montesi 
 Aroldo Tieri as Carlo 
 Eduardo Ciannelli as Capo delle spie 
 Jackie Frost as Olga Voronowska 
 Virgilio Riento as Proprietario Negozio

References

Bibliography
 Aprà, Adriano. The Fabulous Thirties: Italian cinema 1929-1944. Electa International, 1979.
 Chiti, Roberto & Poppi, Roberto. Dizionario del cinema italiano: Dal 1945 al 1959. Gremese Editore, 1991.

External links
 

1951 films
1950s Italian-language films
Films scored by Mario Nascimbene
Italian comedy films
1951 comedy films
Italian black-and-white films
Films directed by Mario Soldati
1950s Italian films